François Garde (born 1959 in Le Cannet, Alpes-Maritimes) is a French writer and high-ranking official

Administrative career 
 Graduated in 1984 of the ENA (class Louise Michel),
 Deputy Secretary-General of New Caledonia from 1991 to 1993
 Administrator-Superior of French Southern and Antarctic Lands (from 25 May 2000 to 19 December 2004)
 Secretary-General of the Government of New-Caledonia, August 2009 – August 2010, 
 Vice-President of the Administrative court at Dijon, then Grenoble.

Works 
Garde began to write at the age of over forty years and since 2003 has published various books and two novels.

Essays 
2003: Les Institutions de la Nouvelle-Calédonie.,
2006: Paul-Émile Victor et la France de l'Antarctique.,
2015: La Baleine dans tous ses états.

Novels 
2012: .
 prix Goncourt du premier roman 2012
 grand prix Jean-Giono 2012.
 prix littéraire des grands espaces Maurice Dousset 2012
 prix Hortense Dufour 2012.
 prix Edmée de La Rochefoucauld 2012
 prix Emmanuel Roblès 2012
 prix Amerigo Vespucci 2012.
 prix Ville de Limoges 2012.<ref>[http://www.ledauphine.com/haute-savoie/2012/04/04/l-essentiel-c-est-d-ecrire-et-pas-d-avoir-des-prix François Garde : L’essentiel, c’est d’écrire et pas d’avoir des prix…'].</ref>
2013: Pour trois couronnes, Gallimard
2016: L’Effroi'', Gallimard

References

External links 
 François Garde on France Inter
 Entretien avec François Garde on La Cause littéraire
 François Garde on France Culture

École nationale d'administration alumni
21st-century French non-fiction writers
Prix Goncourt du Premier Roman recipients
Grand prix Jean Giono recipients
Prix Emmanuel Roblès recipients
1959 births
People from Le Cannet
Living people
Prefects of the French Southern and Antarctic Lands